HMS Basilisk was a Serpent-class bomb vessel of the Royal Navy, one of ten such vessels commissioned in 1695 to support land assaults on continental ports. Initially commissioned as part of Admiral John Berkeley's fleet during the Nine Years' War, she also saw service as an exploratory vessel along the St Lawrence River, and later as part of the victorious British forces at the Battle of Cape Passaro.

At 163 tonnes burthen she was the largest vessel in her class and also the last survivor of it; all nine of her sister ships had been lost or broken up by the time she was decommissioned and broken up at Deptford Dockyard in 1729.

References

Bibliography

 

1690s ships
Ships built in Wapping
Bomb vessels of the Royal Navy